Phantom Thread is a 2017 American historical drama film written and directed by Paul Thomas Anderson, and starring Daniel Day-Lewis, Vicky Krieps and Lesley Manville. Set in 1950s London, it stars Day-Lewis as an haute couture dressmaker who takes a young waitress, played by Krieps, as his muse. It marked Day-Lewis's final film role to date. The film is the first Anderson film shot outside the United States, with principal photography beginning in January 2017 in Lythe, England. It is Anderson's second collaboration with Day-Lewis, following There Will Be Blood (2007), and his fourth with composer Jonny Greenwood.

Phantom Thread premiered in New York City on December 11, 2017, and was theatrically released in the United States on December 25, 2017. The film received acclaim for its acting, screenplay, direction, musical score, costume design, and production values. It was chosen by the National Board of Review as one of the top ten films of 2017, and is considered one of the best films of the 2010s.

At the 90th Academy Awards, the film was nominated for Best Picture, Best Director, Best Actor for Day-Lewis, Best Supporting Actress for Lesley Manville and Best Original Score, and won for Best Costume Design. It also earned four nominations at the 71st British Academy Film Awards, winning for Best Costume Design, and received two Golden Globe nominations.

Plot
In 1954 London, fashion designer Reynolds Woodcock creates dresses for members of high society, even royalty. His clients view him as a genius whose creations enable them to become their best selves; but his creativity and charm are matched by his obsessive and controlling personality. Cyril, his sister, manages the day-to-day operations of his fashion house and tries to protect him from anything that might distract him from his work. The superstitious Reynolds is haunted by the death of their mother, and often stitches hidden messages into the linings of the dresses he makes.

After designing a new gown for a revered client, Lady Harding, Reynolds visits a restaurant near his country house and meets a foreign waitress, Alma Elson. She accepts his invitation to dinner. Their relationship blossoms, and she moves in with him, becoming his model, muse, and lover, although the physicality between the two is very subtle. Cyril initially distrusts Alma but comes to respect her willfulness and determination.

At first, Alma enjoys being a part of Reynolds's work, but he proves aloof, hard to please, and finicky; as a result, they start to bicker. When Alma tries to show her love for Reynolds by preparing a romantic dinner, he lashes out, saying he will not tolerate deviations from the routines he has worked hard to perfect. Alma retaliates by poisoning Reynolds's tea with wild mushrooms gathered outside the country house. As he readies a wedding gown for a Belgian princess, Reynolds collapses, damaging the dress and forcing his staff to work all night to repair it. He becomes gravely ill and has hallucinations of his mother.  Alma stays by his side, tirelessly nursing him back to health.

After Reynolds recovers, he tells Alma that a house that does not change "is a dead house," and asks her to marry him.  Taken aback, she hesitates but then accepts. Following a pleasant honeymoon in Switzerland, however, Reynolds and Alma start bickering again as Reynolds's domineering personality reasserts itself. Cyril reveals to Reynolds that Lady Harding is now a client at a rival fashion house, and suggests that his classic, conservative designs may be going out of style. Reynolds blames Alma for being more a distraction than an inspiration, and Alma overhears him tell Cyril that it may be time to end the marriage.

At the country house, Alma makes Reynolds an omelette poisoned with the same mushrooms as before. As he chews his first bite, she informs him that she wants him weak and vulnerable so that he has to depend on her to take care of him. Reynolds willingly swallows the bite and tells her to kiss him before he is sick. As Reynolds lies ill once again, Alma imagines their future with children, a rich social life, and with a bigger role for her in the dressmaking business. She acknowledges that while there may be challenges ahead, their love and their complementary needs can overcome them.

Cast

Production
Anderson became interested in the fashion industry after reading about designer Cristóbal Balenciaga. Reynolds Woodcock's obsessive fastidiousness is loosely inspired by English-American fashion designer Charles James. Daniel Day-Lewis, a renowned method actor, spent a year learning dressmaking under the tutelage of Marc Happel in preparation for the role. Day-Lewis gained enough skills that enabled him to recreate an iconic dress by Balenciaga during the year.

Filming
Principal photography began in late January 2017 in Lythe, England, United Kingdom, with a number of other locations in the North York Moors National Park also featuring, including Robin Hood's Bay and Staithes. Filming also took place in 2017 at Owlpen Manor in the Cotswolds and in the London neighbourhood of Fitzrovia, in Fitzroy Square, and Grafton Mews. Woodcock drives a maroon Bristol 405 in the film. Filming also took place at the Grandhotel Giessbach, Brienz, Switzerland, Lake Brienz, and Brienzer Rothorn. The New Year's Eve party was filmed at the Blackpool Tower ballroom with approximately 500 supporting artistes.

Cinematography
It was reported in June 2017 that Anderson himself would be serving as cinematographer for the film, because Robert Elswit, Anderson's frequent collaborator for cinematography, was absent during production. Anderson denied this, saying there is no official credit for cinematography and that it was a "collaborative effort". Michael Bauman, who previously worked as Anderson and Elswit's gaffer, was credited as "lighting cameraman". Anderson and Bauman pushed their 35 mm film stock and filled its frames with "theatrical haze" to "dirty up" their look; according to Bauman: "One of the first things [Paul] said was, 'Look, this cannot look like The Crown. That was a big thing. When people think of a period movie it becomes this beautifully polished, amazingly photographed—I mean, The Crown looks beautiful—but super clean, gorgeous light, and he was clear it couldn't look like that."

Soundtrack

The soundtrack was composed by Jonny Greenwood, who previously worked with Anderson on the soundtracks for There Will Be Blood (2007), The Master (2012) and Inherent Vice (2014). It was nominated for the Academy Award for Best Original Score, Greenwood's first Academy Award nomination. Greenwood's soundtrack features prominently in the film, with nearly ninety minutes of music appearing during the film's 130-minute runtime.

Reception

Box office
Phantom Thread grossed $21.2 million in the United States and Canada, and $26.6 million in other territories, for a worldwide total of $47.8 million, against a production budget of $35 million.

After three weeks in limited release, where it made a total of $2.8 million, the film was added to 834 theaters on January 19, 2018 (for a total of 896), and grossed $3.8 million over the weekend, finishing 12th at the box office. The subsequent weekend, following the announcement of its six Oscar nominations, and having added 125 theaters, the film grossed $2.9 million.

Critical response

Phantom Thread received widespread critical acclaim. On review aggregator Rotten Tomatoes, the film has an approval rating of 91%, based on 358 reviews, with an average rating of 8.5/10. The site's critics consensus reads: "Phantom Threads finely woven narrative is filled out nicely by humor, intoxicating romantic tension, and yet another impressively committed performance from Daniel Day-Lewis." On Metacritic, the film has a weighted average score of 90 out of 100, based on 51 critic reviews, indicating "universal acclaim".

The A.V. Clubs A.A. Dowd gave the film an A−, calling it a "charitable and even poignantly hopeful take on the subject [of being in a relationship with an artist]" and wrote that "in the simple, refined timelessness of its technique, Phantom Thread is practically a love letter to classic aesthetic values—cinematic, sartorial, or otherwise". The Observer critic Mark Kermode gave the film five stars, describing it as "a deftly spun yarn" and praised Daniel Day-Lewis' performance, calling his role as a "perfect fit [in a] beautifully realised tale of 50s haute couture".

Christy Lemire of the Los Angeles Film Critics Association placed the film second on her list of ten best films of 2017, describing it as "captivating" and "one of Paul Thomas Anderson's absolute best", as well as singling out Jonny Greenwood's score as "intoxicating". Michael Wood, writing for the London Review of Books, saw the film as unsuccessfully referencing other gothic films such as Rebecca from the 1940s. He also wrote: "Can we imagine a long future for this couple? The film can, and does, but the picture is so hackneyed – pram, baby, walk in the park – that it has to be a dream, or an irony."

Top ten lists
Phantom Thread was listed on many critics' top ten lists for 2017.

 1st – Marlow Stern, The Daily Beast
 1st – Ben Kenigsberg, RogerEbert.com
 2nd – Sasha Stone, Awards Daily
 2nd – Alison Willmore, BuzzFeed
 2nd – Christy Lemire, RogerEbert.com
 3rd – Justin Chang, Los Angeles Times
 3rd – Glenn Kenny, RogerEbert.com
 4th – Mark Olsen, Los Angeles Times
 4th – Michael Phillips, Chicago Tribune
 5th – Eric Kohn, IndieWire
 5th – Brian Tallerico, RogerEbert.com
 5th – Joshua Rothkopf, Time Out New York
 5th – A.A. Dowd & Ignatiy Vishnevetsky, The A.V. Club
 6th – Matt Zoller Seitz, RogerEbert.com
 6th – Richard Brody, The New Yorker
 6th – A. O. Scott, The New York Times
 6th – Todd McCarthy, The Hollywood Reporter
 8th – Manohla Dargis, The New York Times
 8th – Matt Singer, ScreenCrush
 8th – Emily Yoshida, New York
 9th – Christopher Orr, The Atlantic
 9th – Peter Rainer, The Christian Science Monitor
 10th – David Ehrlich, IndieWire
 10th – David Edelstein, New York
 10th – Peter Travers, Rolling Stone
 Top 10 (listed alphabetically) – Ty Burr, The Boston Globe
 Top 10 (listed alphabetically) – Dana Stevens, Slate
 Top 10 (listed alphabetically) – Joe Morgenstern, The Wall Street Journal

Accolades

References

External links
 
 
 
 

2017 films
2017 romantic drama films
2010s American films
2010s English-language films
2010s historical drama films
2010s historical romance films
American historical drama films
American historical romance films
American romantic drama films
Annapurna Pictures films
BAFTA winners (films)
Films about fashion designers
Films about fashion in the United Kingdom
Films about food and drink
Films directed by Paul Thomas Anderson
Films produced by Megan Ellison
Films scored by Jonny Greenwood
Films set around New Year
Films set in 1954
Films set in 1955
Films set in London
Films shot in Lancashire
Films shot in London
Films shot in North Yorkshire
Films shot in Switzerland
Films that won the Best Costume Design Academy Award
Films with screenplays by Paul Thomas Anderson
Focus Features films
Universal Pictures films